Miricacalia is a genus of flowering plants in the groundsel tribe within the daisy family.

Species
There is only one accepted species, Miricacalia makineana, native to Japan.
formerly included
see Parasenecio 
Miricacalia firma (Kom.) Nakai - Parasenecio firmus (Kom.) Y.L.Chen

References

Monotypic Asteraceae genera
Flora of Japan
Senecioneae